Reiner Geye (born 22 November 1949 in Duisburg; died 8 August 2002 in Mainz) was a German football player.

His career started with TuS Duisburg 48/99 and Eintracht Duisburg. From 1968 he played for Fortuna Düsseldorf. Between 1971 and 1986 he played in the German Bundesliga for Fortuna Düsseldorf and 1. FC Kaiserslautern in 485 matches, in which he scored 113 goals.

He also won four caps for West Germany (one goal) in the 1970s.

In later years, he served as honorary vice chairman and manager (until 1996) of 1. FC Kaiserslautern.

Geye died of liver disease at age 52.

Honours
 DFB-Pokal finalist: 1980–81

References

External links
 
 
 

German footballers
Germany international footballers
1949 births
2002 deaths
Fortuna Düsseldorf players
1. FC Kaiserslautern players
Bundesliga players
Association football forwards
Footballers from Duisburg
West German footballers